iSport International was a British motor racing team that competed in the GP2 Series. The team was founded by Paul Jackson, Gavin Bickerton-Jones and Richard Selwin, former members of the Petrobras Junior Team in 2004, ahead of the inaugural GP2 season. Their factory is based in Carleton Rode near Norwich in the United Kingdom.

iSport's most successful season in GP2 came in 2007, when they won the teams' title, with Timo Glock winning the drivers' championship. The team finished second in 2008, and won the 2009–10 GP2 Asia Series drivers' and teams' championship. They pulled out of the GP2 series before the 2013 season, after encountering financial difficulties. iSport returned to motorsport in 2014, running a GP2 team for Russian Time.

Racing history

GP2 Series
The inaugural season of the GP2 series saw iSport take the fastest time in the shoot-out for race numbers, giving drivers Scott Speed and Can Artam numbers 1 and 2 for the season. While the team was regularly fast at races, neither driver was able to win a race. Nevertheless, Speed finished third in the championship with consistent points-scoring finishes, whilst Artam was 22nd overall with two points. iSport finished the season in fourth place in the teams' championship. For 2006, Speed graduated to Formula One with a drive at Scuderia Toro Rosso and Artam left the series. iSport filled its seats with Ernesto Viso and Tristan Gommendy, the latter of whom was later replaced by Timo Glock at the mid-season point. Viso took the team's first two victories in the category and Glock added two more; the part-season driver overhauling his teammate's points tally to finish the year fourth overall in the drivers' standings, with Viso sixth and Gommendy 20th. iSport improved to third in the teams' championship.

Glock remained with the team for 2007 and was joined by 2006 race winner Andreas Zuber. Glock won five races on his way to the championship title, prevailing in a season-long duel with Lucas di Grassi (ART Grand Prix). Zuber supported him with a single further victory on his way to ninth overall, although the teammates embarrassingly collided whilst accelerating away from the front row of the grid at the feature race of the round held at Magny-Cours. To cap a successful year, iSport also won its first teams' championship. For the 2008 season, iSport joined the GP2 Asia Series in its inaugural year, signing Bruno Senna and Karun Chandhok. After a low-key Asia campaign, which saw the team finish fifth in the standings, the Senna-Chandhok combination was retained for the main series season, in which Senna emerged as champion Giorgio Pantano's main rival, accumulating two victories on his way to the runner-up position in the drivers' table. Chandhok also won a race and finished tenth overall; iSport ended the season second in the teams' championship to the Barwa International Campos Team.

For the 2008-09 Asia Series season, the departing driver line-up was replaced with reigning Formula Renault 3.5 Series champion Giedo van der Garde and a series-encouraged Asian driver, Hamad Al Fardan. Van der Garde and Al Fardan scored 13 points between them, resulting in an eighth-place championship finish for the team. For the 2009 main series, Van der Garde was retained with Diego Nunes replacing Al Fardan; Van der Garde won three races but only managed seventh in the drivers' championship, whilst Nunes was back in 20th. iSport finished fifth overall in the teams' championship. Both drivers then moved on, and were replaced by Davide Valsecchi and Oliver Turvey for both the 2009-10 Asia Series and the 2010 main series. In the Asia Series, Valsecchi won three races and sealed the championship title, with rookie driver Turvey backing him up to take sixth overall, allowing iSport to win the Asia teams' championship for the first time. In the main series, however, the team was unable to maintain this level of form: Valsecchi ended the season strongly with the outfit's sole victory at Yas Marina, but was overshadowed by Turvey, who concluded the year sixth in the drivers' championship to Valsecchi's eighth. iSport maintained its fifth place in the teams' championship.

iSport again signed two new drivers—Sam Bird and Marcus Ericsson—for the abortive 2011 Asia Series and the 2011 main series. On this occasion, neither driver won a race: Bird finished sixth in the final standings with a single position, with Ericsson four places behind him but the team improving to fourth overall. Ericsson was retained for 2012, with Jolyon Palmer signed from the Arden team to replace the Formula Renault 3.5-bound Bird. The drivers' fortunes improved, as they took a race victory apiece, but iSport slipped to sixth in the teams' championship at season's end.

The iSport GP2 contract was acquired by RT Russian Time for the 2013 season.

Formula One
The iSport team was believed to have been evaluating an entry to Formula One, but team principal Paul Jackson said that he was waiting for the FIA to finalise its plans to cap budgets in the sport before making any solid plans. "For many years I've said if the conditions were right and the numbers made sense, then we'd enter F1," said Jackson. "The budget cap could be the perfect opportunity for us, but until we find out what the magic number is, I don't know if it's do-able or feasible. When it's all in print, we'll look at it, start doing our sums and talking to potential investors." iSport's possible F1 entry was cancelled after they pulled out of GP2.

Results

GP2 Series
i Sport International

† Glock had scored 5 points for BCN Competición during the first 9 races of the season.

GP2 Series 
(key) (Races in bold indicate pole position) (Races in italics indicate fastest lap)

RT Russian Time

GP2 Asia Series

Footnotes

References

External links
 
 

}
}

British auto racing teams
GP2 Series teams
2004 establishments in the United Kingdom
Auto racing teams established in 2004
Auto racing teams disestablished in 2014